The 1952 Boston University Terriers football team was an American football team that represented Boston University as an independent during the 1952 college football season. In its sixth season under head coach Aldo Donelli, the team compiled a 5–4–1 record and was outscored by their opponents by a total of 139 to 216.

Schedule

References

Boston University
Boston University Terriers football seasons
Boston University Terriers football